Herbert Sears may refer to:
 Bert Sears (Herbert Sydney Sears), English-born politician in Saskatchewan, Canada
 Herbert M. Sears, yachtsman and businessman in Boston, Massachusetts